The Wars of Gods and Men is the fourth album by American heavy metal band Warrior. It is the first and only album to feature vocalist Marc Storace of Krokus.

Track listing 

"The Wars of Gods and Men" – 04:54
"Do It Now" – 03:14
"Never Live Your Life Again" – 03:50
"Salvation" – 04:00
"3 Am Eternal" – 03:27
"Mars" – 04:02
"Unseen Forces" – 03:54
"Hypocrite" – 03:59
"Naked Aggression" – 04:41
"Love Above All" – 04:30

Personnel 
Marc Storace – vocals
Joe Floyd – guitars
Rob Farr – bass
Dave DuCey – drums

Jason Miller – additional lead guitars

2004 albums